Sagan is an impact crater on Mars, located in the Oxia Palus quadrangle at 10.8° N and 30.7° W. It measures approximately 90 kilometers in diameter and was named after American astronomer Carl Sagan, who founded the Planetary Society and is best known for the television series Cosmos. The naming was approved by IAU's Working Group for Planetary System Nomenclature in 2000.

To the northeast of Sagan is the larger Masursky, and to the south is Barsukov.

Impact craters generally have a rim with ejecta around them, in contrast volcanic craters usually do not have a rim or ejecta deposits.  As craters get larger (greater than 10 km in diameter) they usually have a central peak. The peak is caused by a rebound of the crater floor following the impact.

See also 
 Impact crater
 Impact event
 List of craters on Mars
 Ore resources on Mars
 Planetary nomenclature
 Water on Mars

References 

Impact craters on Mars
Oxia Palus quadrangle